Neoramia is a genus of South Pacific sheetweb spiders first described by Raymond Robert Forster & C. L. Wilton in 1973.

Species
 it contains twenty-two species, all from New Zealand:

Neoramia allanae Forster & Wilton, 1973 – New Zealand
Neoramia alta Forster & Wilton, 1973 – New Zealand
Neoramia charybdis (Hogg, 1910) – New Zealand
Neoramia childi Forster & Wilton, 1973 – New Zealand
Neoramia crucifera (Hogg, 1909) – New Zealand (Auckland Is.)
Neoramia finschi (L. Koch, 1872) – New Zealand
Neoramia fiordensis Forster & Wilton, 1973 – New Zealand
Neoramia hoggi (Forster, 1964) – New Zealand (Campbell Is.)
Neoramia hokina Forster & Wilton, 1973 – New Zealand
Neoramia janus (Bryant, 1935) – New Zealand
Neoramia koha Forster & Wilton, 1973 – New Zealand
Neoramia komata Forster & Wilton, 1973 – New Zealand
Neoramia mamoea Forster & Wilton, 1973 – New Zealand
Neoramia marama Forster & Wilton, 1973 – New Zealand
Neoramia margaretae Forster & Wilton, 1973 – New Zealand
Neoramia matua Forster & Wilton, 1973 – New Zealand
Neoramia minuta Forster & Wilton, 1973 – New Zealand
Neoramia nana Forster & Wilton, 1973 – New Zealand
Neoramia oroua Forster & Wilton, 1973 – New Zealand
Neoramia otagoa Forster & Wilton, 1973 – New Zealand
Neoramia raua Forster & Wilton, 1973 – New Zealand
Neoramia setosa (Bryant, 1935) – New Zealand

References

Araneomorphae genera
Spiders of New Zealand
Stiphidiidae
Taxa named by Raymond Robert Forster